Rich Swingle is an American film actor, screenwriter and stage actor. He also is a Freedom Finder for Graceworks Inc. and teaches at the Rocky Mountain Christian Filmmaking Camp. After growing up on a farm in Medford, Oregon, he went on to study at George Fox University, Gordon–Conwell Theological Seminary and Hunter College, ultimately receiving a master's degree from the latter. He has appeared in numerous films, including A Christmas Snow, Indescribable, Alone yet Not Alone and Beyond the Mask, and he is well known for his one-man theatre acts.

Biography 
Rich Swingle was born in Medford, Oregon. His mother is a medical transcriptionist, and his father is a pilot, inventor, and retired farmer. Rich was raised on a farm that had been in the family since the 1920s. Swingle graduated from George Fox University, where "he spent many of his weekends visiting elementary schools and churches as part of the student touring drama group George Fox Players." He was named their alumnus of the year in 1999. He is an evangelical Christian and, "After years of feeling called to ministry, Rich Swingle entered Massachusetts’ Gordon–Conwell Theological Seminary, one of the country's top five evangelical seminaries," which he attended  from 1991 to 1992. He received his master's degree in theatre from Hunter College, where he studied under Eric Bentley--who was a student of C. S. Lewis--Tina Howe playwriting, Patricia Sternberg (sociodrama)--a student of sociodrama's inventor, Jacob L. Moreno--and Jerome Coopersmith (screenwriting)--screenwriter An American Christmas Carol and for many episodes of the original Hawaii Five-O. He has been married to Joyce Swingle since 1998. She is currently a counselor, actor, and pastor at Westchester Chapel Church of the Nazarene in White Plains, New York.

Playwright and stage actor 
Swingle has lived in New York City since 1993, where he has acted in a number of productions of both stage and film. He has performed and/or taught on six continents, in 39 nations and in hundreds of venues, mostly with a dozen one-man plays he has written or helped develop. His one man play "Beyond the Chariots" about the later life of Eric Liddell has been featured around the world and at various Olympic events. He also performed it at the Edinburgh Festival. Regarding the production and life of Eric Liddell, Swingle said, "Chariots of Fire deeply inspired me as a young man. I ran a cross-country race in China 20 years ago so that aspect of Eric's life is embedded in mine even more. I admire his deep convictions and willingness to stand behind them..." "Despite all the fame and adulation he was showered with after the Olympics and all the career opportunities that were presenting themselves at the time, Liddell chose to return to China and teach."

Swingle has performed several other one-man acts, such as "5 Bells for 9/11", a play tells the stories of three people, including firefighter Bruce Van Hine from Squad 41. "Soon after 9/11, an Indiana church asked Mr. Swingle to find a New Yorker willing to speak about his or her experiences during the tragedy. "And I realized, wait a minute, why just have one person tell their story of that day?"

Presentations trainer and coach 
Since 2001 Swingle has been a Freedom Finder for Graceworks, helping presenters in a variety of fields overcome stage fright and connect with their audiences through seminars and project coaching. Swingle said, "I have seen fear visibly melt away as clients learn to connect with their listeners. It's exhilarating to see people go beyond what they thought possible!"

Director 
He worked with John Kirby (acting coach on The Lion, the Witch and the Wardrobe, Déjà Vu, The Count of Monte Cristo) to co-direct Tartuffe and Our Town, during which he performed the role of the Stage Manager, and The Miracle Worker. He also directed Cyrano de Bergerac, The Jeweler's Shop, Twelve Angry Jurors, and Much Ado About Nothing, all with assistance from Patricia Mauceri and Susan Somerville Brown.

Teacher 
He has performed and/or taught workshops in more 50 colleges and universities, including his alma mater, George Fox University, University of Memphis, Namseoul University in Korea, Singapore Bible College, and Asia-Pacific Nazarene Theological Seminary in the Philippines. Each spring he teaches a workshop at Princeton University. Swingle also spoke at the Ivy League Congress on Faith and Action, hosted by the Harvard University chapter of Christian Union. He has taught acting seminars and performed on the main stage at the Christian Worldview Film Festival in San Antonio, Texas.

Film actor 
Since 2010 Swingle has been performed in over 30 films. He plays the lead role of Mitchell Little, which was distributed through AMC Independent starting February 12, 2016. His wife Joyce has played his fictional wife in five of those projects: Indescribable, The Unexpected Bar Mitzvah, Rather to Be Chosen, and Mayflower II, "A Matter of Perspective".

Awards

Bibliography

Filmography

Audio Drama / Voice Over

Video Game

References

External links 

Graceworks

Living people
American Christians
American male film actors
American male stage actors
George Fox University alumni
Male actors from Oregon
People from Medford, Oregon
Year of birth missing (living people)